Desi Rascals is a structured-reality television series broadcast by Sky 1 and Sky Living in the United Kingdom. Desi Rascals chronicled the lives of a multi-generational cast living within the British Asian community of London. The show was created by former producer of The Only Way Is Essex, Tony Wood, and Bend It Like Beckham director, Gurinder Chadha. Desi Rascals was cancelled on 15 October 2015 after disappointing ratings in the second series.

History
The show was first commissioned by Celia Taylor, head of non-scripted at Sky, in September 2014. Sky Living director Antonia Hurford-Jones told Broadcast that the "way into" Desi Rascals would be through the eyes of a group of British Asian thirty-somethings. The first series began on 20 January 2015, continuing for twelve episodes, with two episodes broadcast each week (on Tuesday and Friday at 8pm). The show's title is a play on the name of British rapper, Dizzee Rascal, and Desi, a term for people from the Indian subcontinent.

After a successful first series, a second was commissioned by Sky and began broadcasting on Sky 1 on 22 July 2015. Unlike the debut series, the second failed to attract much of an audience and on 15 October 2015 it was revealed that a third series would not be commissioned.

Filming

Filming took place just days before broadcast in the West London areas of Gerrards Cross, Harrow, Hounslow, Wembley and Pinner.

Main cast

Episodes

Series 1 (2015)
The first series of Desi Rascals, with a total of twelve episodes, began showing on Tuesday 20 January 2015. It was broadcast on Sky Living and had an average of 105,000 viewers. Bollywood actor Amitabh Bachchan made a special appearance in the fourth episode broadcast on 30 January 2015.

Series 2 (2015)
Immediately after the finale of the first series, Sky commissioned a second series. On 6 July 2015, it announced that former The Only Way Is Essex cast member Jasmine Walia, her boyfriend Ross Worswick (Ex on the Beach), The Apprentice star Solomon Akhtar and Farah Rai of Take Me Out will all be starring in the second series. The second series trailer was released on 10 July 2015 and unlike the first series,  will be broadcast on the main Sky channel Sky 1 rather than Sky Living. The second, and last series, began on 22 July 2015 and lasted eight episodes.

References 

2015 British television series debuts
2015 British television series endings
2010s British reality television series
English-language television shows